Pseudomicrodes is a genus of moths of the family Noctuidae. The genus was erected by George Hampson in 1910.

Species
Pseudomicrodes atrifusa Hampson, 1910 Sri Lanka
Pseudomicrodes decolor (Rebel, 1907) Yemen (Socotra)
Pseudomicrodes ecrufa (Hampson, 1905) South Africa
Pseudomicrodes fuscipars Hampson, 1910 South Africa
Pseudomicrodes mediorufa Hampson, 1910 South Africa
Pseudomicrodes namibiensis (Hacker, 2004) Namibia
Pseudomicrodes ochrocraspis Hampson, 1910 South Africa
Pseudomicrodes polysticta Hampson, 1910 Ghana
Pseudomicrodes rufigrisea Hampson, 1910 Kenya, Ethiopia
Pseudomicrodes scoparioides (Hacker, 2004) Namibia
Pseudomicrodes varia Berio, 1944 Ethiopia, Kenya

References

Acontiinae